Explore More Discovery Museum, formerly known as the Harrisonburg Children's Museum is a non-profit museum focusing on interactive, multi-sensory learning experiences for children, located in Harrisonburg, Virginia.  Themed learning areas include a kitchen and farmer's market, construction zone, medical center, television studio, science lab, theater, farm, garage and art center.

History
In 2002, it was a mobile museum without permanent display space.  In 2003, it moved into 30 N. Main Street and acquired a full-time executive director with additional part-time staff.

On September 4, 2010, the old museum closed in order to relocate to a new facility in the renovated A&N Department Store building at 150 S. Main St. which had been vacant. Construction for renovation of the first two floor (exclusive of exhibits) cost $415,464. 

The new museum was opened in November 2010.

References

Children's museums in Virginia
Tourist attractions in Harrisonburg, Virginia
Museums established in 2002
Buildings and structures in Harrisonburg, Virginia
Museums in Rockingham County, Virginia